Desmond Blue is an album recorded by American jazz saxophonist Paul Desmond released in 1962 and was his first LP for RCA Victor. 
The album was produced by George Avakian, who had worked with Desmond at Columbia Records (when Desmond was recorded as part of the Dave Brubeck Quartet). Avakian left Columbia in 1958 to join the brand new Warner Bros. Records, where he produced Desmond's previous album, First Place Again. Joining RCA Victor in 1960, Avakian once again recruited Desmond to his label, and he produced all six of the albums Desmond recorded for RCA Victor as a leader. Desmond Blue was also the first Desmond solo album to feature the saxophonist in an orchestral setting. RCA reissued the album in 1978 as Paul Desmond - Pure Gold Jazz (ANL1-2807). Desmond returned to the orchestral format later in the decade, when he signed with CTI Records and recorded Summertime.

Reception

Allmusic awarded the album 4 stars stating "The tone of the album: lush, reflective, thought-provoking, and soul-stirring. This work is quite a plus for any listener and especially those who consider themselves avid fans of Paul Desmond".

Track listing
All compositions by Paul Desmond except where noted.
 "My Funny Valentine" (Richard Rodgers, Lorenz Hart) – 3:53 	
 "Desmond Blue" – 3:42
 "Then I'll Be Tired of You" (Arthur Schwartz, Yip Harburg) – 4:08 	
 "I've Got You Under My Skin" (Cole Porter) – 4:41 	
 "Late Lament" – 4:11
 "I Should Care" (Axel Stordahl, Paul Weston, Sammy Cahn) – 3:52 	
 "Like Someone in Love" (Jimmy Van Heusen, Johnny Burke) – 4:13 	
 "Ill Wind" (Harold Arlen, Ted Koehler) – 3:52
 "Body and Soul" (Johnny Green, Frank Eyton, Edward Heyman, Robert Sour) – 4:51

Note
Recorded at Webster Hall in New York City on September 13, 1961 (track 1), September 28, 1961 (tracks 5-7) and October 2, 1961 (tracks 2-4, 8 & 9).

Personnel
Paul Desmond – alto saxophone
Albert Richman – French horn (tracks 1-4, 8 & 9)
Phil Bodner (tracks 5-7), Robert Doty (track 1), George Marge (track 1), Romeo Penque (tracks 2-9), Stan Webb (tracks 2-4, 8 & 9) – woodwinds
Gloria Agostini (tracks 2-9), Eugene Bianco (track 1) – harp
Jim Hall – guitar
Gene Cherico (track 1), Milt Hinton (tracks 2-9) – bass
Connie Kay (track 1), Bobby Thomas (tracks 2-9) – drums
Unidentified string section conducted by Bob Prince

References

Paul Desmond albums
1962 albums
RCA Records albums
Albums produced by George Avakian